Taeniogonalos gestroi is a species of wasp in the family Trigonalidae. It is a hyperparasitoid that parasitise Ichneumonidae and Tachinidae larva inside the caterpillars of Lepidoptera.

Distribution
It has a wide range, as it is native to India (Sikkim), Malaysia, China (Hainan, Jiangsu, Yunnan), Myanmar, Thailand, Laos, Indonesia, Taiwan and Papua New Guinea.

Description

Ground colour is black with yellow maculae (spots; patterns). Wings are hyaline (translucent), with the forewings having a brown translucent area covering most of the radial cell. Adults are diurnal. It was previously thought to be a subspecies or a variety of a different species, Taeniogonalos thwaitesii, which is native to Sri Lanka.

Females lack a medio-apical process on the second sternite.

References

Parasitica
Parasitic wasps
Hymenoptera of Asia
Insects described in 1908